The Diocesan Shrine and Parish of Our Lady of the Abandoned  (Spanish: Santuario y Parroquia de Nuestra Señora de los Desamparados; Tagalog: Dambanang Pandiyosesis at Parokya ng Ina ng mga Walang Mag-Ampon), better known as Our Lady of the Abandoned Parish Church, is a Roman Catholic church in Marikina, the Philippines. The church enshrines one of several images of the Madonna and Child venerated as miraculous, which has received a Pontifical decree of coronation.

The church itself is a testament of a religious controversy rooting back from Marikina's early history wherein both the Jesuits and Augustinians fought over the ecclesiastical control of the area. The church is also known for featuring Metro Manila's longest Holy Week processions with around 83 floats as of 2019, and the third overall after the St. Augustine Parish in the Town of Baliuag and the San Isidro Labrador Parish in the Town of Pulilan, both located in the province of Bulacan and featuring at least 110 floats.

History

Early years

Catholicism in what is now Marikina began when the settlement was again ceded to the Augustinians by the Jesuits. On 10 March 1687, Governor Gabriel Cruz Elasque ordered the transfer of Marikina to the oversight of the Augustinians and merged with the ministry of San Mateo. He instructed Don Juan Pimentel, the Mayor of Tondo, to vacate and demolish the visita of Jesús de la Peña as the Marikina River would flood the site during the rainy season. The visita could not accommodate the growing congregation, forcing the Austin friars to transfer operations across the Marikina to higher ground, where the much larger, present structure was built. The church was subsequently made an independent parish in 1690.

The venerated image
On 23 October 1791, the church was consecrated by the Archdiocese of Manila for the Virgin's said title so that it could not be used for any secular purpose. In 1898, during the Philippine–American War, the first image was burnt along with pertinent records of the devotion in Marikina. In 1902, a new image was created, and is the one presently venerated in the parish.

Restoration
The church suffered major damages during the tumultuous years of the Philippine–American War in the early 1900s and the carillion was totally destroyed during the second world war. By 1957, OLA church was restored and refurbished by Father Silvestre dela Cruz of Archdiocese of Manila with the help from various religious and civic organisations.

The episcopal coronation
The community initially approached the Apostolic Nuncio to petition for the Canonical Coronation of the image; however, the petition was declined due to few supporting documents. Meanwhile, then Bishop of Antipolo Crisostomo Yalung honored the Patrona with an Episcopal Coronation to remember the 100th Anniversary of the venerated image. The celebration was held on 12 May 2002, wherein the coronation was facilitated by Former President Gloria Macapagal-Arroyo.

The canonical coronation
Pope Benedict XVI granted the venerated image a decree of canonical coronation on 22 April 2005, one of his first formal institutional acts as a pope. The coronation would later take place on 23 October 2005.

Former Archbishop of Manila, Gaudencio Rosales presided over the Mass and canonical rites together with the Antipolo Bishop, Gabriel V. Reyes.

The Architecture

The church was first constructed from bamboo and leaves by the Augustinian friars in a place called Chorillo (present-day Barangka) on 1572. On 1687, the real construction began in its present location to stabilize an ecclesiastical jurisdiction over the area. Constructed in Baroque style, it is characterized by a heavily fortified facade, large-scale ceiling paintings, a dramatic central projection of the facade, a round-style pediment for the bell-tower and the opulent blending of painting and architecture.

Shrine rectors
On 5 August 2007, which is the Feast of the Dedication of the Basilica of St. Mary Major in Rome, the Bishop of Antipolo, Gabriel V. Reyes, D.D., consecrated the Parish Church of Our Lady of the Abandoned as a diocesan shrine in honor of Our Lady under the title Maria, Inang Mapag-Ampon ng Marikina, Nuestra Señora de los Desamparados. On 8 September 2007, a little more than a month after the dedication of the church as a shrine, Bishop Francisco de Leon, who had been appointed by Pope Benedict XVI as Auxiliary Bishop of Antipolo, was assigned by the Bishop of Antipolo as Parish Priest of Our Lady of the Abandoned. Msgr. Mariano Balbago Jr. relinquished the title of parish priest, but was appointed Rector and Parish Administrator, assisting Bishop De Leon in his duties. Upon the departure of Msgr. Balbago from the shrine and parish, Bishop De Leon was also appointed rector by the Bishop of Antipolo, but this time assisted by vice rector and parish administrator Fr. Reynante U. Tolentino.

Assisting in the Pastoral Team of the parish are as follows:
Francis Roi Madarang - Parochial Vicar
Conegundo Garganta - Resident Priest
Sandy Anonuevo
Casiano Anthony Cotiamco

Gallery

Sources
The Official Website of the City of Marikina

See also

Jesus dela Peña Chapel
Virgen de los Desamparados

References

External links 

 Diocesan Shrine and Parish of Our Lady of the Abandoned of Marikina on Facebook
 Official website

Roman Catholic churches in Metro Manila
Statues of the Madonna and Child
Buildings and structures in Marikina
Cultural Properties of the Philippines in Metro Manila
Churches in the Roman Catholic Diocese of Antipolo